The House of Tyszkiewicz (singular: , , singular: , , singular: , , singular: , ,) was a wealthy and influential Polish-Lithuanian magnate family of Ruthenian origin, with roots traced to the times of the Grand Duchy of Lithuania. They held the Polish coat of arms Leliwa. Their nobility was reaffirmed in Polish–Lithuanian Commonwealth and the Russian Empire.

The family traces its roots to a 15th-century Ruthenian boyar Kalenik Mishkovich and derives from the name of his grandson, Tysha with the addition of the patronymic, resulting in Tyszkiewicz-Kalenicki. A branch of the family Germanised the name to Tischkowitz and a few members of this branch are still to be found in Germany and the UK.

Places named Tyszkiewicz Palace, "former Tyszkiewicz Palace", Tiškevičiai Palace, and other historical properties of the family are located in Warsaw, Kraków and Vilnius, as well as in numerous towns of modern Poland, Belarus, Lithuania and Ukraine (in Palanga, Kretinga, Lahojsk, Raudondvaris, Berdychiv, Biržai, Kavarskas, Deltuva, Trakai, Lentvaris, Seredžius, etc.)

Notable members
 Count Eustachy Tyszkiewicz (1814–1874), nobleman and archaeologist 
 Janusz Skumin Tyszkiewicz (1570–1642), Polish–Lithuanian nobleman and politician who was a sponsor of Baroque music 
 Janusz Tyszkiewicz Łohojski (1590–1649), Polish–Lithuanian magnate and politician
 Katarzyna Eugenia Skumin Tyszkiewicz (–1648), Polish noblewoman (daughter of Janusz Skumin Tyszkiewicz)
 Count Konstanty Tyszkiewicz (1806–1868), Polish-Lithuanian noble, archaeologist and ethnographer
 Ludwik Skumin Tyszkiewicz, Field Lithuanian Hetman (Grand Treasurer) of Polish–Lithuanian Commonwealth
 Count Michal Tyszkiewicz (1828–1897), collector and amateur Egyptologist
 Count Michał Zygmunt Tyszkiewicz (1903–1974), diplomat and songwriter
 Samuel Tyszkiewicz (1889–1954) was a Polish typographer
 Stefan Tyszkiewicz (1894–1976), engineer and inventor, soldier and political activist married into the extended Russian imperial family 
 Tadeusz Tyszkiewicz, (1774–1852), a general
 Teodor Skumin Tyszkiewicz, Grand Treasurer of Lithuania of Polish–Lithuanian Commonwealth
 Count  (1857—1930) - Ukrainian politician, patron of Prosvita Society, ambassador of Ukrainian State to Vatican.

Family estates
 Makhnivka, Koziatyn Raion

Manors

Gallery
Palaces connected with the Tyszkiewicz family

References
 
 Walerian Kalinka, Dzieła, chapter "Żywot Tadeusza Tyskiewicza", 1900, Google Print, p.195-198 (public domain)

Further reading

 Potocka-Wąsowiczowa, Anna z Tyszkiewiczów. Wspomnienia naocznego świadka. Warszawa: Państwowy Instytut Wydawniczy, 1965.